The Bellanca XSOE was a prototype American scout observation floatplane built for the United States Navy by the Bellanca Aircraft Company. It was never accepted by the Navy and only the prototype was built.

The prototype was designated XSOE-1 by the United States Navy and it first flew in 1936. The XSOE-1 was a single-float biplane with one additional float under each low wing. Powered by a  Wright R-1820 radial engine, it had an enclosed cabin for a crew of two.

Specifications (XSOE-1)

See also

References

Notes

Bibliography

 

XSOE
1930s United States military reconnaissance aircraft
Floatplanes
Biplanes
Single-engined tractor aircraft
Aircraft first flown in 1936